Hou Minghao (born 3 August 1997 in Beijing, China), also known as Neo Hou, is a Chinese actor and singer. He is best known for his roles in the film The Devotion of Suspect X; and in the dramas Cambrian Period (2017), When We Were Young (2018), and The Lost Tomb 2: Explore With the Note (2019).

Background
Hou was a former S.M. Entertainment trainee in 2012. In 2014, he debuted with the Chinese boy band Fresh Teenager Geek, but left in 2016 to pursue his solo endeavors.

Discography

Singles

Filmography

Film

Television series

Variety show

Awards and nominations

References

External links 
 

1997 births
Living people
21st-century Chinese male actors
Chinese male television actors
Chinese male film actors
Chinese idols
Chinese Mandopop singers
Male actors from Beijing
21st-century Chinese male singers